Barcode Brothers were a Danish trance duo consisting of Christian Møller Nielsen and Anders Øland. They are known for club hits like "Dooh Dooh", "Flute" and "SMS", and released two studio albums before disbanding in 2004.

Discography

Studio albums

Singles

Promotional singles

Remixes
Balearic Bill - "Destination Sunshine" (Barcode Brothers Remix) (1999)
Star - "Heaven's on Fire" (Barcode Brothers Fire Mix) (1999)
Star - "This Is My Life" (Barcode's Club) (1999)
S.O.A.P. – "S.O.A.P. Is in the Air"  (Barcode Brothers Club remix) (2000)

References

External links
Barcode Brothers on Facebook
Barcode Brothers on Myspace

Musical groups established in 1999
Musical groups disestablished in 2004
Danish trance music groups
Danish DJs
Danish musical duos
Musical groups from Copenhagen
Universal Music Group artists

sah:Barcode Brothers